Gifford S. Robinson (May 28, 1843 – May 28, 1936) was an American jurist and politician. He was a justice of the Iowa Supreme Court from January 1, 1888, to December 31, 1899, appointed from Buena Vista County.

Biography
Gifford S. Robinson was born in Tremont, Illinois on May 28, 1843. He was educated at Illinois State Normal University and the Washington University School of Law in St. Louis.

During the Civil War, he enlisted with the 115th Illinois Infantry Regiment and fought in the battles of Franklin and Chickamauga. He was wounded in the latter, and was discharged. He moved to Iowa to practice law in 1870.

Political career
Robinson was elected mayor of Storm Lake, Iowa, after which he won a seat in the state House of Representatives in 1875 and the state Senate in 1881.

He was elected to the state Supreme Court, serving from 1888 to 1899, and was chief justice for the 1892 session.

Death
Gifford S. Robinson died at a cottage on West Okoboji Lake on May 28, 1936.

References

1842 births
1936 deaths
Chief Justices of the Iowa Supreme Court
Illinois State University alumni
Iowa state senators
Members of the Iowa House of Representatives
People from Tazewell County, Illinois
People of Illinois in the American Civil War
Washington University School of Law alumni